Three Pines is a mystery television series starring Alfred Molina based on the novel series by Louise Penny, centered on Chief Inspector Armand Gamache. It premiered on Amazon Prime Video on 2 December 2022 with four murder mysteries, each spanning two episodes. In March 2023, the series was canceled after one season.

Premise
Chief Inspector Armand Gamache of the Sûreté du Québec police force sees things that others do not: the light between the cracks, the mythic in the mundane, and the evil in the seemingly ordinary. He investigates a series of murders in Three Pines, an idyllic village in the Eastern Townships of Quebec, Canada, and he discovers long-buried secrets while facing ghosts of his own. 

Unlike the books, the series includes a secondary storyline throughout the season, with Gamache investigating the disappearance of a young woman.

Cast

Main
 Alfred Molina as Chief Inspector Armand Gamache
 Rossif Sutherland as Jean-Guy Beauvoir
 Elle-Máijá Tailfeathers as Isabelle Lacoste
 Tantoo Cardinal as Bea Mayer
 Clare Coulter as Ruth Zardo
 Sarah Booth as Yvette Nichol
 Anna Tierney as Clara Morrow
 Roberta Battaglia as Crie

Recurring
 Julian Bailey  as Peter Morrow
 Frédéric-Antoine Guimond as Olivier Brule
 Pierre Simpson as Gabri Dubeau
 Tamara Brown as Myrna Landers
 Patricia Summersett as Angela Blake
 Marie-France Lambert as Gamache's wife Reine-Marie
 Frank Schorpion 
 Marcel Jeannin
 Georgina Lightning
 Crystle Lightning
 Isabel Deroy-Olson
 Anna Lambe as Blue Two-Rivers
 Marie-Josée Bélanger
 Mylène Dinh-Robic as Sandra Morrow
Laurence Leboeuf as Louise Morrow

Episodes

Production
On 21 May 2020, it was announced that Left Bank Pictures had optioned the 18-book novel series by Louise Penny, which centres on Chief Inspector Armand Gamache, with Amazon Prime Video in final negotiations to order the project to series. Emilia di Girolamo was attached as head writer, and Sam Donovan was announced as the lead director, directing four episodes. Indigenous Mohawk director Tracey Deer is a series consultant and directed two episodes. On 2 September 2021, it was announced that Alfred Molina was cast in the lead role of Gamache. Rossif Sutherland, Elle-Máijá Tailfeathers, Tantoo Cardinal, Clare Coulter, Sarah Booth, and Anna Tierney were also cast in main roles.

Principal photography was completed between August and December 2021. Filming took place over five five-week periods in Montreal and rural Quebec, specifically in the Eastern Townships, the region of Quebec where the novels take place and original author Penny resides.  Specifically, outdoor scenes in the village are filmed in  Saint-Armand.

The soundtrack includes music from Elisapie, The Bearhead Sisters, Chloé Stafler, and Riit.

On 13 March 2023, it was announced that the series was canceled after one season.

Release
On 1 November 2022, Amazon Studios announced the premiere date and official trailer of Three Pines.  With eight one-hour episodes in total, the first two episodes premiered on 2 December 2022, with two new episodes released each week until the finale on 23 December. Initially, the series was set to air only in certain countries: the US, Canada, UK, Ireland, Australia, New Zealand, Sweden, Denmark, Finland, and Greenland.

Reception
As of 4 December 2022, after the first two episodes had begun streaming, the score on Rotten Tomatoes was 78% based on reviews from 9 critics. 
Chase Hutchinson of Collider praised Alfred Molina's performance as Inspector Gamache, rating the series a B and wrote, "It is in its more melancholic and macabre moments that Three Pines stumbles upon something more sinister that elevates it a bit beyond a standard mystery tale." Brian Tallerico of RogerEbert.com called it "a collection of intelligent two-hour mysteries that fans of Agatha Christie or even Columbo should watch." 
Amber Dowling of Variety gave it a positive review and concluded "For now, this short-but-sweet adaptation offers a sweeping cinematic taste of cultures and stories that are deserving of the global platform Prime Video offers, all while doing justice to the best-selling novels on which they’re based."

References

External links
 

2020s British crime drama television series
2020s British mystery television series
2020s Canadian crime drama television series
2022 British television series debuts
2022 British television series endings
2022 Canadian television series debuts
2022 Canadian television series endings
Amazon Prime Video original programming
British mystery television series
Canadian mystery television series
English-language television shows
French-language television shows
Television series by Amazon Studios
Television series by Left Bank Pictures
Television series by Sony Pictures Television
Television shows based on Canadian novels
Television shows filmed in Montreal
Television shows set in Quebec